Jan Mertens (born 25 February 1995) is a Belgian footballer who currently plays for Lommel United as a midfielder in the Belgian Second Division.

Club career 

Mertens made his Belgian Pro League debut at 18 October 2014 against R.S.C. Anderlecht. He replaced Ivan Obradović as an 88th-minute substitute in a 1–1 draw at Achter de Kazerne.

References

1995 births
Living people
Belgian footballers
K.V. Mechelen players
Lommel S.K. players
Belgian Pro League players
Challenger Pro League players
Association football midfielders